Karen Murphy may refer to:

Karen Murphy (lawn bowls) (born 1974), Australian lawn bowler
Karen Murphy (producer), American film producer
Karen Murphy (Pennsylvania nurse), Pennsylvania Secretary of Health
Karen Murphy, a character in the 2011 film Abduction